Andrey Kuznetsov was the defending champion, but was no longer eligible to participate in the juniors.

Márton Fucsovics defeated Benjamin Mitchell in the final, 6–4, 6–4 to win the boys' singles tennis title at the 2010 Wimbledon Championships.

Seeds

  Jason Kubler (third round)
  Agustín Velotti (first round)
  Tiago Fernandes (third round)
  Duilio Beretta (first round)
  Jiří Veselý (third round)
  Damir Džumhur (quarterfinals)
  Denis Kudla (quarterfinals)
  James Duckworth (quarterfinals)
  Renzo Olivo (quarterfinals)
  Dominic Thiem (first round)
  Máté Zsiga (second round)
  Mikhail Biryukov (third round)
  Márton Fucsovics (champion)
  Juan Sebastián Gómez (second round)
  Roberto Quiroz (first round)
  Kevin Krawietz (second round)

Draw

Finals

Top half

Section 1

Section 2

Bottom half

Section 3

Section 4

References

External links

Boys' Singles
Wimbledon Championship by year – Boys' singles